Dan Lissvik (born 1978) is a Swedish musician and producer. Together with Rasmus Hägg he founded the award-winning group Studio. In November 2008, he released his first solo album entitled 7 Trx+Intermission, which was followed by an album in June 2009 from The Crepes consisting of him and Fredrik Lindson from The Embassy.

Lissvik was also a driving force behind the record label Service, which was created in 2001. Among other things, Dan designed the artwork for several of the releases.

Dan is a varied producer, having produced albums and songs for bands such as The Embassy, Young Galaxy and Taken by Trees. In 2016, Lissvik released a solo 12-inch album inspired by fatherhood titled Midnight

Discography

LP, 12" and 7"
Studio

7"   The End of Fame (2001)
7"   The Jungle (2002)
7"   Down Here Like You (2002)
7"   West Side Part 1 and 2 (2007)
12"  No Comply (2006)
12"  Life's a Beach! Todd Terje and Prins Thomas Remixes (2006)
Lp   West Coast (2006)
Lp   Yearbook 1 (2007)
Lp   West Coast (Second Edition, double LP) (2007)
Lp   Yearbook 2 (2008)

D.Lissvik
Lp  7 Trx + intermission (Information, 2008)
Midnight (Smalltown Supersound, 2016)
4xLP  Archive 1ish (Vinyl Export, 200 copies, 2020)

The Crêpes
Lp  What Else? (2009)

Producer / Writer
7"   Studio - The End of Fame (Writer/Producer/Mix)
7"   Studio - The Jungle (Writer/Producer/Mix)
7"   Studio - Down Here Like You (Writer/Producer/Mix)
7"   Parlour - Parlour No1 (Mix/Master)
7"   Studio - West Side (Writer/Producer/Mix)
12"  Studio - No Comply (Writer/Producer/Mix)
12"  Embassy - State 08 (Writer/Producer/Mix)
12"  Embassy - You Tend To Forget (Producer/Mix)
12"  Most Valuable Players - Some Nerve (co-Producer/Mix)
Ep   Parlour - Parlour No2 (Master)
Ep   Parlour - Parlour No3 (Master)
Ep   The Mary Onettes - Love Forever (Producer/Mix)
Ep   Hanna - Lioness (Writer/Producer/Mix)
Lp   Studio - West Coast (Writer/Producer/Mix)
Lp   Studio - Yearbook 1 (Writer/Producer/Mix)
Lp   Studio - Yearbook 2 (Writer/Producer/Mix)
Lp   Lake Heartbeat - Trust in Numbers (Producer/Mix)
Lp   Parlour - Frak session (Master)
Lp   Ikons - Ikons (co-Producer/Mix)
Lp   Lissvik - 7 Trx + intermission (Writer/Producer/Mix)
Lp   Taken By Trees - East of Eden (Producer/Mix)
Lp   The Crêpes - What Else? (Writer/Producer/Mix)
Lp   Young Galaxy - Shapeshifting (Producer/Mix)

Remixes
 Shout Out Louds - Possible (Studio Remix)
 Rubies - A Room Without A Key (Studio Remix)
 Love is All - Turn The Radio Off (Studio Remix)
 A Mountain of One - Brown Piano (Studio Remix)
 Brennan Green - Escape From Chinatown (Studio Remix)
 Kylie Minogue - 2 Hearts (Studio Remix)
 Williams - Love On A Real Train (Studio Remix)
 The Little Ones - Morning Tide (Studio Remix)
 Fontän - Early Morning (Studio Remix)
 Windsurf - Bird of Paradise (Studio Remix)
 Arp - Pastoral Symphony (Studio Remix)
 Bear in Heaven - You Do You (Studio Remix)
 Steve Mason - Just A Man (Studio Remix)
 Fever Ray - When I Grow Up (Lissvik Remix)
 Mock & Toof - Shoeshine Boogie (Lissvik Remix)
 This Is Head - 0002 (Lissvik Remix)
 Joe Worricker - Bobby Blue (Lissvik Remix)
 James Yuill -First in Line (Lissvik Remix)
 Korallreven - Honey Mine (Lissvik Remix)
 Tiedye - Fisherman's Bend (Lissvik Remix)
 Cocknbullkid - Hold On To Your Misery (Lissvik Remix)
 Ceo - Illuminata (Lissvik Remix)
 Architeq - Odyssey (Lissvik Remix)
 Foals - Miami (Lissvik Remix)
 Det Vackra Livet - Viljan (Lissvik Remix)
 Mungolian Jetset - We Are The Shining (Lissvik Remix)
 Serenades - Birds (Lissvik Remix)
 Andreas Mattsson - Parklands (Lissvik Remix)
 Foster The People - Helena Beat (Lissvik Remix)
 Chad Valley - Fall 4 U (Lissvik Remix)
 Haim - Forever (Lissvik Remix)
 The 1975 - Settle Down  (Lissvik Remix)
 INVSN - Down In The Shadows  (Dan Lissvik Remix)

References

External links
 Official website
 Studio at Last.fm
 Pitchfork review of 7 Trx+Intermission
 Pitchfork review of Yearbook 1
 Stylus review of West Coast

1978 births
Living people
Swedish musicians
Swedish record producers
Remixers
Smalltown Supersound artists